Champtocé-sur-Loire (literally Champtocé on Loire) is a commune in the Maine-et-Loire department of western France. Its castle gained notoriety as a scene of some of the crimes of the medieval child murderer, Gilles de Rais.

See also
Communes of the Maine-et-Loire department

References

Champtocesurloire